No Regrets may refer to:

Albums 

 No Regrets (All-4-One album), 2009
 No Regrets (Dope album), 2009
 No Regrets (Elisabeth Withers album), 2010
 No Regrets (Faye Wong album), 1993
 No Regrets (Hardcore Superstar album), 2003
 No Regrets (Pandora album), 1999
 No Regrets (The Walker Brothers album), 1975
 No Regrets, album and title track thereof by Joe Sample & Randy Crawford, 2008

Songs 
 "No Regrets" (Amanda Lear song), 1983
 "No Regrets" (Dappy song), 2011
 "No Regrets" (Elisabeth Withers song), 2010 song from the same album 
 "No Regrets" (Magic! song), 2016
 "No Regrets" (Robbie Williams song), 1998
 "No Regrets" (Tom Rush song), 1968, re-recorded 1974 and subsequently covered by numerous artists
 "No Regrets", a song by Aesop Rock, from the album Labor Days
 "No Regrets", a song by Bon Jovi, from the album Bounce
 "No Regrets", a song by Eminem, from the album Music to Be Murdered By
 "No Regrets", a song by Gob, from the album The World According to Gob
 "No Regrets", a song written by Harry Tobias and Roy Ingraham, and first recorded by Henry King and His Orchestra, 1936
 "No Regrets", a song by Masta Ace, from the album Disposable Arts
 "No Regrets", a song by Phoebe Snow, from the album Second Childhood (a cover of the Tobias/Ingraham composition)
 "No Regrets", a song by Sugababes from The Lost Tapes
 "No Regrets", a song by Tom Cochrane, from the album Mad Mad World
 "Non, je ne regrette rien" (English translation "No, I regret nothing"; often titled "No Regrets"), a 1956 song best known from Édith Piaf's version

Other
 No Regrets (TV series), a Hong Kong television drama produced by TVB
 No Regrets (book), a 2011 book co-written by former Kiss lead guitarist Ace Frehley

See also 
 No Regret (disambiguation)